The 1957 Segunda División Peruana, the second division of Peruvian football (soccer), was played by 10 teams. The tournament winner, Mariscal Castilla was promoted to the Primera División Peruana 1958.

Results

Standings

Relegation playoff

External links
 La Historia de la Segunda 1957

 

Peruvian Segunda División seasons
Peru2
2